Lincoln-West High School (L-W) is a high school located in Cleveland, in the U.S. state of Ohio and part of the Cleveland Metropolitan School District. The school's name is a by-product of the merger between Cleveland's Lincoln High School and West High School. The current school building was built in 1970.

Lincoln-West has a large multicultural and multilingual population including over 41 nationalities and 25 languages. First generation Americans and immigrants represented at the academy include: Puerto Rican, Russian, Ukrainian, Arabic, Mexican, Dominican, Chinese, Albanian, Nepali, Arabic, Urdu, Vietnamese, Laotian/Thai, African, Polish and Croatian.

Originally, the school district was divided into the East and West Senate Conferences with L-W sports teams playing in the West. In the late 1970s, the CMSD reorganized the conferences into the North and South Senate Conferences with L-W in the North Senate.

The Lincoln-West mascot and nickname is the Wolverines and the school colors are red, white and blue.

State championships

Lincoln High School
 Baseball: 1946

West High School
 Wrestling: 1947, 1950, 1951
 Boys cross country: 1950

Notable alumni 
 Dartanyon Crockett, bronze-medal winner in men's judo at the London 2012 Paralympics and Rio 2016 United States paralympian, class of 2009
 Dave Ford, professional baseball player in Major League Baseball, class of 1975

Lincoln High School
 Walt Yowarsky, professional football player, coach, and scout in the National Football League, class of 1946

West High School
 Linda A. Eastman, chief librarian of the Cleveland Public Library, class of 1885
 Alwin C. Ernst, co-founder of the accounting firm of Ernst & Ernst, class of 1899
 Albert Bushnell Hart, American historian, class of 1870
 Isaac C. Kidd, Rear Admiral in the United States Navy, class of 1902
 James Ford Rhodes, American historian, class of 1865

Notes and references

External links
 
Lincoln-West High School yearbooks available on Cleveland Public Library Digital Gallery, various years 1975 through 2007

High schools in Cuyahoga County, Ohio
Education in Cleveland
Public high schools in Ohio
School buildings completed in 1973
Cleveland Metropolitan School District